Antonello Fassari (born 4 October 1952) is an Italian actor and comedian.

Life and career
Antonello Fassari was born in Rome, where he practiced gymnastics at a competitive level until age 18. In the mid-1970s he attended the Silvio D'Amico National Academy of Dramatic Arts, and then Teatro Laboratorio in 1977 under director by Luca Ronconi, with whom he later worked in numerous stage plays. Occasionally a singer-songwriter, in 1984 he composed one of the first Italian rap songs, "Roma di notte".

After several roles on stage, television, and in films, his breakout came in 1991 with the Rai Tre variety show Avanzi.

In 2000, Antonello Fassari made his directorial debut with the comedy film Il segreto del Giaguaro, which was a resounding flop at the box office.

From 2006 to 2014, Fassari was part of the leading cast in the Italian television series I Cesaroni.

Selected filmography
 Fatto su misura (1985) 
 Italian Postcards (1987)
 Casa mia, casa mia... (1988)
 Le finte bionde (1989)
 Valentina (1989)
 Dark Illness (1990)
 Faccione (1991)
 The Invisible Wall (1991)
 Count Max (1991)
 Un'altra vita (1992)
 Sognando la California (1992)
 State Secret (1995)
 Waiters (1995)
 Who Killed Pasolini? (1995)
 Selvaggi (1995)
 Celluloide (1996)
 E adesso sesso (2001)
 Love Returns (2004)
 The Goodbye Kiss (2006)
 Sympathy for the Lobster (2007)
 Box Office 3D: The Filmest of Films (2011)
 The Move of The Penguin (2013)
 Suburra (2015)
 All You Need Is Crime (2019)
 L'agenzia dei bugiardi (2019)

References

External links 

1952 births
Male actors from Rome
Italian male stage actors
Italian male film actors
Italian male television actors
Living people
Italian comedians
Accademia Nazionale di Arte Drammatica Silvio D'Amico alumni